Team Malaysia was a Dota 2 eSports team based in Kuala Lumpur, Malaysia.

Team Malaysia may also refer to any of a number of sports team representing Malaysia in international competition:

National teams
Association football
 Malaysia national football team
 Malaysia women's national football team
Badminton
 Malaysia national badminton team
Baseball
 Malaysia national baseball team
Basketball
 Malaysia national basketball team
 Malaysia women's national basketball team
Beach soccer
 Malaysia national beach soccer team
Cricket
 Malaysia national cricket team
 Malaysia women's national cricket team
Field hockey
 Malaysia men's national field hockey team
 Malaysia women's national field hockey team
Futsal
 Malaysia national futsal team
Ice hockey
 Malaysia men's national ice hockey team
 Malaysia women's national ice hockey team
Kabaddi
 Malaysia national kabaddi team
Netball
 Malaysia national netball team
Rugby union
 Malaysia national rugby union team
 Malaysia women's national rugby union team
 Malaysia national rugby sevens team (Sevens)
Squash
 Malaysia men's national squash team
 Malaysia women's national squash team
Tennis
 Malaysia Davis Cup team
 Malaysia Fed Cup team
Volleyball
 Malaysia women's national volleyball team